Howe is an unincorporated community in Butte County, Idaho, United States. Howe has a post office with ZIP code 83244.

History
Howe's population was estimated at 50 in 1909, and was 25 in 1960.

References

Unincorporated communities in Butte County, Idaho
Unincorporated communities in Idaho